Adaílton José dos Santos Filho, also known as Adaílton (born 16 April 1983) is a Brazilian former footballer who played as a central defender.

Career

Club
Adaílton began his career with Vitória, where he captured three State League titles. In 2004, he was signed by Ligue 1 side Rennes and went on to appear in 42 league matches for the French club. In 2007, he returned to Brazil signing with Santos and quickly established himself with the club helping them to the 2007 Campeonato Paulista title.  In August 2008, Adaílton renewed his contract with Santos, until December 2009 and signed in February 2010 for FC Sion. He became a regular starter for the Swiss side and helped the club capture the 2010–11 Swiss Cup. He left Sion during the summer of 2012 for Henan Jianye. As the club was relegated from the Chinese Super League, Adaílton returned to Sion during the next transfer window in the winter of 2013.

After appearing regularly for Sion, Adaílton was sent on loan to Swiss league rival FC Chiasso. Adaílton featured regularly for Chiasso in his one season at the club making 26 league appearances and scoring two goals. At the conclusion of the Swiss league Adaílton returned to Brazil signing with Bahia. After only six months with the club in which he appeared in 4 matches, Adaílton left the club.

On 30 December 2014 it was announced that Chicago Fire had signed Adaílton.

International
Adaílton was a member the Brazil national under-20 football team that captured the 2003 FIFA World Youth Championship. During the tournament he scored his lone goal for Brazil in a 1–1 draw with the Czech Republic on 1 December 2003.

Honours 
Sion
Swiss Cup: 2010–11
 Paulista State League: 2007
 Bahia State League: 2002, 2003, 2004
 Nordeste Cup: 2003
 World Cup (U 20): 2003

References

External links 

 Adailton's profile, stats & pics
 
 

1983 births
Living people
Brazilian footballers
Brazil under-20 international footballers
Brazilian expatriate footballers
Esporte Clube Vitória players
Stade Rennais F.C. players
Santos FC players
FC Sion players
Henan Songshan Longmen F.C. players
FC Chiasso players
Esporte Clube Bahia players
Chicago Fire FC players
Miami FC players
Campeonato Brasileiro Série A players
Ligue 1 players
Swiss Super League players
Chinese Super League players
Major League Soccer players
North American Soccer League players
Expatriate footballers in France
Expatriate footballers in Switzerland
Association football defenders
Sportspeople from Salvador, Bahia
Expatriate footballers in China
Brazilian expatriate sportspeople in China
Expatriate soccer players in the United States
Pan American Games medalists in football
Pan American Games silver medalists for Brazil
Footballers at the 2003 Pan American Games
Medalists at the 2003 Pan American Games